Paopi 25 - Coptic Calendar - Paopi 27

The twenty-sixth day of the Coptic month of Paopi, the second month of the Coptic year. On a common year, this day corresponds to October 23, of the Julian Calendar, and November 5, of the Gregorian Calendar. This day falls in the Coptic season of Peret, the season of emergence.

Commemorations

Saints 

 The martyrdom of Saint Timon the Apostle 
 The martyrdom of the Seven Saints on the Mount of Saint Anthony

References 

Days of the Coptic calendar